Great Bear Lake is a lake in the boreal forest of Canada. It is the largest lake entirely in Canada (Lake Superior and Lake Huron are larger but straddle the Canada–US border), the fourth-largest in North America, and the eighth-largest in the world.

The name originated from the Chipewyan language word , meaning "grizzly bear water people". The Sahtu, a Dene people, are named after the lake. Grizzly Bear Mountain on the shore of the lake also comes from Chipewyan, meaning, "bear large hill".

The Sahoyue (Grizzly Bear Mountain) peninsula on the south side of the lake and the Edacho (Scented Grass Hills) peninsula on the west side form the Saoyú-ʔehdacho National Historic Site of Canada.

Geography

Great Bear Lake is covered with ice from late November to July.

The lake is known for its considerable clarity.

Arms 
Arms of Great Bear Lake include the Smith Arm (northwest), the Dease Arm (northeast), the McTavish Arm (southeast), the McVicar Arm (south) and the Keith Arm (southwest). The community of Délı̨nę is located on the Keith Arm near the outflow of the Great Bear River that flows west into the Mackenzie River at Tulita.

Tributaries 
Rivers flowing into Great Bear Lake include the Whitefish River, Big Spruce River, Haldane River,  Bloody River, Sloan River, Dease River and the Johnny Hoe River.

Prehistoric geology
Great Bear Lake lies between two major physiographic regions: the Kazan Uplands portion of the Canadian Shield and the Interior Plains. It was part of glacial Lake McConnell in the pre-glacial valleys reshaped by erosional ice during the Pleistocene. Since, the lake has changed from post-glacial rebound following the ice melting. Precambrian rocks of the Canadian Shield form the eastern margin of the McTavish Arm. These rocks of the Precambrian are sedimentary and metamorphic deposits supplemented by igneous intrusions forming dikes and sills.

Climate

Human use

The community of Délı̨nę is on the lake, near the headwaters of the Bear River. There is an ice crossing from Délı̨nę to the winter road on the far side of the Great Bear River.

The fuel was removed from the truck by 2 am, 8 March.

Three lodges around the lake are destinations for fishing and hunting. In 1995, a  lake trout was caught, the largest ever caught anywhere by angling.

Mining 
In 1930, Gilbert LaBine discovered uranium deposits in the Great Bear Lake region. The former mining area Port Radium, site of the Eldorado Mine, where pitchblende was discovered, was located on the eastern shore. Echo Bay Mines Limited leased the old camp and mill at Port Radium to recover silver and copper values from 1965 to 1981.

Cultural significance

The Prophecy
Great Bear Lake is paramount in the Délı̨nę peoples' identity, laws and culture. Hence, conserving it is critical for the Délı̨nę people. ɂehtsǝ́o Erǝ́ya, a Dene Elder, is widely regarded as a prophet, making over 30 prophecies which have been interpreted as having come true. His prediction for the end of times claims that, as the world dries up, the little remaining life will flock to, and end on the banks of the Great Bear Lake, a lake seen as a physical beating heart to humanity. The Délı̨nę people have followed these prophecies closely, the cultural considerations being a driving force for self-governance and environmental sustainability.

Gallery

References

External links

1867 account of the lake by William Carpenter Bompas

Lakes of the Northwest Territories